Kenny Aaronson (born April 14, 1952 in Brooklyn, New York) is an American bass guitar player. He has recorded or performed with several notable artists such as Bob Dylan, Rick Derringer, Billy Idol, Joan Jett and the Blackhearts, Foghat, Sammy Hagar, Billy Squier, New York Dolls, and Hall and Oates. Since 2015, he has been the bass player for The Yardbirds.

Early life and career 
He started playing drums at the age of eleven, following in his older brother's footsteps. Aaronson switched to electric bass at the age 14 after becoming enamored by the bass on Motown records and was strongly influenced by James Jamerson. As a teenager he played bass for Brooklyn-based hard rock band Dust, which included Marc Bell (a.k.a. Marky Ramone) and Richie Wise, which released two albums in 1971 and 1972 on the Kama Sutra label. In 1973, Aaronson joined the New York band Stories, whose single, "Brother Louie", reached #1 on the Billboard, Cashbox and Record World charts.

From 1976-1979, Aaronson played bass for Rick Derringer.

Peak success 
In 1988, Aaronson was named Bassist of the year by Rolling Stone. That year Aaronson also toured with Bob Dylan, but he was forced to leave the tour after developing skin cancer. Aaronson underwent surgery, which was successful in defeating the disease.  Aaronson was the bassist in the house band for the MTV Guitar Greats Show where along with Dave Edmunds, Chuck Leavell and Michael Shrieve, he backed up artists such as Steve Cropper, Brian Setzer, Dickey Betts, Link Wray, Neal Schon, Johnny Winter, Lita Ford, Tony Iommi and Dave Gilmour. Kenny also auditioned for the Rolling Stones in 1994.

Aaronson has toured and recorded with a variety of artists including Billy Idol, Billy Squier, Foghat, Brian Setzer, Dave Edmunds, HSAS (with Sammy Hagar, Neal Schon, and Michael Shrieve), Mick Taylor, Graham Parker, Hall and Oates, Edgar Winter, Robert Gordon, Leslie West Band, Rick Derringer and Joan Jett among others. Aaronson was a regular member of Jett's backing group the Blackhearts from 1991 to 1995. Aaronson was one of the few Blackheart band members to co-write a track with Jett. The song, "World Of Denial", was recorded for the 1994 album "Pure and Simple" but was not released in the U.S. until 2001's Fit To Be Tied- Great Hits by Joan Jett and The Blackhearts".

Recent work 
In July 2011, Aaronson supported singer/songwriter John Eddie and played with Corky Laing & The Memory Thieves. Also in 2011, Aaronson recorded with ex Bongo's singer Richard Barone on a tribute album for The Runaways. Aaronson joined the New York Dolls and toured in the summer of 2011 supporting Mötley Crüe and Poison.

More recently, 2014 recorded with Gar Francis of the Doughboys, Kurt Reil of The Grip Weeds and Bruce Ferguson of The Easy Out a self-titled full-length album under the name The Satisfactors. In June 2015 the first single of the album called Johnny Commando reached Top 10 in The Netherlands at Ned.FM Radio.

In November 2015, he joined the British band The Yardbirds.

In 2016, Aaronson was featured on former Mambo Sons guitarist/songwriter Tom Guerra's second solo album Trampling Out the Vintage, and in 2018, co-wrote three songs with Guerra, originally intended for The Yardbirds, which were included on Guerra's third solo album, American Garden.  In 2020, Aaronson once again figured prominently on Tom Guerra’s fourth solo album ‘’Sudden Signs of Grace,’’ and also appeared in the video for the title track.

Discography 
With Dust
 Dust (1971)
 Hard Attack (1972)

With Stories
 Brother Louie (1973)
 Traveling Underground (1973)

With Rick Derringer
 Derringer (1976)
 Sweet Evil (1977)
 Derringer Live (1977)
 If I Weren't So Romantic, I'd Shoot You (1978)
 Guitars And Women (1979)
 Rock And Roll Hoochie Koo: The Best Of Rick Derringer (1996)

With Silver Condor
 Trouble At Home (1983)

With Hagar Schon Aaronson Shrieve
 Through The Fire (1984)

With Brian Setzer
 The Knife Feels Like Justice (1986)

With Blue Öyster Cult
 Club Ninja (1985)
 Imaginos (1988)

With Billy Idol
 Vital Idol (1987)

With Michael Monroe
 Not Fakin' It  (1989)

With Joan Jett and the Blackhearts
 Pure and Simple (1994)
 Fit to be Tied writing credit on "World of Denial" (1997, 2006)

With Billy Squier
 Sixteen Strokes lap steel (1995)

With Graham Parker
 Live from New York  (1996)

With Ian McDonald
 Drivers Eyes (1999)

With Tom Guerra and Scott Lawson (Mambo Sons)
 Mambo Sons (1999)

With John Eddie
 Guy Walks into a Bar  (2001)
 Who the Hell is John Eddie (2003)

With Mountain
 Master of War (2007)

With Dana Fuchs
 Lonely for a Lifetime (2003)
 Love to Beg (2011)

With The Satisfactors
 The Satisfactors (2014)

With Radio Exile
 Radio Exile (2015)

With Tom Guerra
 Trampling Out the Vintage (2016)
 American Garden (2018)
 Sudden Signs of Grace (2020)
 Sentimental Junk (2022)

With Mark Duda
 Month of Sundays (2017)

Others
Contributor to "Standing in the Shadows of Motown", The biography of James Jamerson (1989)
Soundtrack "Porky's Revenge" (1990)
Tribute to Otis Blackwell "Brace Yourself" with Joe Louis Walker, Debbie Harry, Ronnie Spector, Kris Kristofferson, Graham Parker, Smithereens(1994)
Sound Track "Boys on the Side" (1995)

References

Notes
 Colin Larkin: The Encyclopedia of Popular Music''. Third edition. Macmillan, New York, N.Y. 1998.

External links
Official website
Interview with Mambo Sons bandmate Tom Guerra for Vintage Guitar Magazine: Kenny Aaronson: From Dust to Dylan. Retrieved September 26, 2006

1952 births
Living people
Musicians from Brooklyn
American rock bass guitarists
American male bass guitarists
Hagar Schon Aaronson Shrieve members
New York Dolls members
Guitarists from New York (state)
20th-century American bass guitarists
20th-century American male musicians